Anaran Rural District is a rural district (dehestan) in the Central District of Dehloran County, Ilam Province, Iran. At the 2006 census, its population was 4,709, in 912 families.  The rural district has 17 villages.

References 

Rural Districts of Ilam Province
Dehloran County